The Central District of Baruq County is in West Azerbaijan province, Iran. At the National Census in 2006, the region's population (as part of Baruq District of Miandoab County) was 15,404 in 3,466 households. The following census in 2011 counted 16,142 people in 4,520 households. At the latest census in 2016, there were 15,800 inhabitants in 4,774 households. After the census, Baruq District was separated from Miandoab County, elevated to county status, and divided into two districts.

References 

Districts of West Azerbaijan Province

Populated places in West Azerbaijan Province

fa:بخش مرکزی شهرستان باروق